The Hood Trilogy is a series of British drama films. The film series began in 2006 with Kidulthood, which was followed by the sequels Adulthood and Brotherhood. The series focuses on the lives of several teenagers in the Ladbroke Grove and Latimer Road area of inner West London. The film series has earned over £7 million worldwide.

Films

Kidulthood 

Kidulthood is a 2006 British drama created by Menhaj Huda. The film focuses on the majority of the characters in the film who generally behave in a violent and lawless manner. They are portrayed as being reckless and antisocial young people who commit crimes such as petty theft and serious violence. The film also showcases how the characters engage in recreational drug taking and some sexual behaviour. It was released on 3 March 2006.

Adulthood 

Adulthood is a 2008 British drama directed by Noel Clarke. The film focuses on Sam the protagonist and his experiences after he is released from jail. Six years after being imprisoned for killing Trife, it’s revealed he has undergone dramatic changes and is not the same person who went inside. It was released on 20 June 2008.

Brotherhood 

Brotherhood is a 2016 British drama directed by Noel Clarke. The film focuses on Sam squaring up to a new world: he realises it comes with new problems, and new challenges that he must face up to. He knows it will require old friends to help him survive new dangers. It was released on 29 August 2016.

Cast and characters

References 

British film series